{{DISPLAYTITLE:E7½}}
In mathematics, the Lie algebra E7½ is a subalgebra of E8 containing E7 defined by Landsberg and  Manivel in order
to fill the "hole" in a dimension formula for the exceptional series En of simple Lie algebras. This hole was observed by Cvitanovic, Deligne, Cohen and de Man. This representation has an invariant symplectic form, and this symplectic form equips  with the structure of a Heisenberg algebra; this Heisenberg algebra is the nilradical in E7½.

See also

Vogel plane

References
 A.M. Cohen, R. de Man, Computational evidence for Deligne's conjecture regarding exceptional Lie groups, C. R. Acad. Sci. Paris, Série I 322 (1996) 427–432.
 P. Deligne, La série exceptionnelle de groupes de Lie, C. R. Acad. Sci. Paris, Série I 322 (1996) 321–326.
 P. Deligne, R. de Man, La série exceptionnelle de groupes de Lie II, C. R. Acad. Sci. Paris, Série I 323 (1996) 577–582.

Lie groups